The Gunsight Pass Shelter in Glacier National Park is a rustic stone building near the treeline. The one-room shelter is equipped with a woodstove. Work began on the shelter in September 1931 and was complete in June 1932 to a design by the National Park Service Landscape Division. The design was inspired by similar cabins built by the Appalachian Mountain Club in the White Mountains of New Hampshire. The shelter is located on the South Loop Trail, itself listed on the National Register of Historic Places.

References

Park buildings and structures on the National Register of Historic Places in Montana
Government buildings completed in 1932
Rustic architecture in Montana
National Register of Historic Places in Flathead County, Montana
1932 establishments in Montana
National Register of Historic Places in Glacier National Park
Mountain huts in the United States